There are over 20,000 Grade II* listed buildings in England. This page is a list of these buildings in the London Borough of Camden.

Buildings

|}

See also
 Grade I listed buildings in Camden

Notes

External links
 

 
Lists of Grade II* listed buildings in London